Noto is a town in Sicily, Italy, and may refer to:
Noto Radio Observatory in Sicily
Roman Catholic Diocese of Noto, Sicily 
Noto Cathedral, Sicily 

Noto may also refer to:

Places
Japan
Noto Peninsula, a peninsula in Japan
Noto Province, an old province of Japan
Noto Airport, an airport in Japan
Noto, Ishikawa (Fugeshi) (能都町), a former town which merged with neighboring towns on the peninsula in 2005 to become:
Noto, Ishikawa (能登町)
Russia
Nötö, the Swedish name for Orexovyj óstrov in Russia

People
Alva Noto, also Noto, the pseudonym of the German artist Carsten Nicolai (born 1965)
Anthony Noto (born 1968), U.S. businessman 
Arisa Noto (born 1988), Japanese singer
Kimie Noto (born 1952), Japanese track athlete 
Lore Noto (1923–2002), producer of The Fantasticks
Mamiko Noto (born 1970), Japanese voice actress
Masahito Noto (born 1990), Japanese footballer 
Phil Noto, U.S. artist 
Sam Noto (born 1930), U.S. jazz trumpeter 
Silvio Noto (1926–2000), Italian radio and television personality 
Tokushige Noto (1902–1991), Japanese sprinter 
Vito Noto, Italian industrial designer

Other
Noto fonts, a font family designed to cover all the scripts encoded in the Unicode standard
Noto (train), a train service operating in Japan
Noto Railway on the Noto Peninsula of Japan 
Notochord, a cartilaginous rod in some animals 
Notochord homeobox (NOTO) gene, a transcription factor encoded by the notochord homeobox gene on chromosome 2
Hermaea noto, a species of sea slug